Riffel is a surname, and may refer to:

 Caspar Riffel (1807–1856), German historian
 James Riffel (born 1961), American film director and screenwriter
 Rena Riffel (born 1969), American actress
 Michael E. Riffel (born 1948) Artist, wood creations, fine art, and literature.

See also
 Riffelsee, also Lake Riffel in Switzerland
 Michael A. Riffel High School, Catholic high school in Saskatchewan, Canada
 Reiffel surname page